Skippack may refer to the following in the U.S. state of Pennsylvania

Skippack Township, Montgomery County, Pennsylvania
Skippack, Pennsylvania, a census-designated place in the above township
Skippack Bridge, a stone arch bridge in Montgomery County
Skippack Creek, a tributary of Perkiomen Creek
Skippack Pike, a historical section of Pennsylvania Route 73